Ellen Perez (born 10 October 1995) is an Australian professional tennis player.

Perez has won five doubles titles on the WTA Tour, one doubles title on the WTA Challenger Tour, as well as two singles and 18 doubles titles on the ITF Circuit. Her career-high rankings in singles and doubles are world No. 162 and No. 15, achieved August 2019 and October 2022, respectively.

Perez made her Grand Slam main-draw debut at the 2016 Australian Open in doubles with Belinda Woolcock; they lost in the first round to Jessica Moore and Storm Sanders. Perez made her first singles Grand Slam appearance at the 2016 US Open, after winning the Australian Wildcard Play-off.

Personal life
Ellen is the daughter of John and Milića Perez and sister to Matt Perez. Ellen is of Spanish descent on her father's side and of Macedonian descent on her mother's side. She picked up a tennis racket at the age of three after receiving a totem tennis pole as a Christmas gift, and she started regular coaching at the age of seven. In 2012, she won the Gallipoli Youth Cup held in Ipswich, Queensland.

She attended the University of Georgia in the United States from 2014 to 2017.

Career

2012–2014: The beginnings
Perez made her debut on the ITF Women's Circuit in March 2012 in Bundaberg, losing in three sets to Jennifer Elie. In September 2013, she recorded her first main-draw singles win in Toowoomba after qualifying. Perez reached the quarterfinals losing to Azra Hadzic. In December 2013, she won her first ITF doubles title in Hong Kong with Abbie Myers.

In 2014, Perez reached the quarterfinal of the Burnie International and Melbourne, and then competed on the ITF Circuit in Europe until June when she started attending college in the United States. Perez ended 2014 with a singles rank of 655 and a doubles rank of 517.

2015–2016: First Grand Slam appearance
In June 2015, Perez returned to play at Bethany Beach where she qualified and reached the singles quarterfinals and the doubles final. The following week in Charlotte, she reached the doubles final. She played across U.S. ITF events for the remainder of 2015.

Perez started her 2016 season in June in U.S. without qualifying for the main draw. In July, she qualified for and won her first singles ITF title in Brussels without dropping a set. She reached a semifinal and final at two subsequent events. Perez won four doubles titles in five weeks across June and July 2016.

In August, Perez won the Australian Wildcard Play-off to make her Grand Slam singles debut at the US Open. She lost to Zhang Shuai in straight sets. Perez said of the experience "It definitely didn't go as planned, or as hoped, but it was great to be able to have my Grand Slam debut and get out on court in front of all the fans and what-not. It was nice." She ended 2016 with a singles rank of 632 and doubles rank of 414.

2017–2018: First WTA Tour match win
Perez began the season with a wildcard into the Sydney International qualifying where she defeated Kateryna Kozlova, ranked 101 in the world. She lost to Naomi Broady in the second round. At the Australian Open qualifying, Perez defeated Tadeja Majerič, then lost to Ana Bogdan.

She returned to play in June where she reached three consecutive doubles finals, winning one. Doubles success continued throughout the rest of the year. In July, Perez qualified for and reached the singles final of Gatineau. This increased her singles ranking to a career-high of 363. Perez returned to Australia and reached the semifinals of Toowoomba and quarterfinals of Cairns.

Perez began the 2018 season, after being given wildcard into the Sydney International where she upset world No. 11, Kristina Mladenovic, in the first round. Her first win on the WTA Tour came when Mladenovic retired with the score 4–6, 2–4. Perez lost in round two to Ashleigh Barty.

At the Australian Open, Perez lost in the first round of qualifying to Valentini Grammatikopoulou. She made the second round at Burnie, Launceston and Perth, and then reached the final of the Clay Court International in April, losing to Jaimee Fourlis. Perez traveled to Europe and North America's ITF Circuit with limited success. In September, she attempted to qualify for two WTA tournaments in Asia before returning to Australia in October where she reached four consecutive ITF finals.

2019–2021: Three WTA titles, Olympics debut and quarterfinals in doubles
Perez commenced 2021 retiring in the first round of the Grampians Trophy. She made the second round of qualifying in both Australian Open and Adelaide International. In March, she won the Abierto Zapopan in doubles with Astra Sharma, it was her second WTA Tour title.

In May, Perez reached the third and final round of the French Open qualifying. In June, she qualified for Wimbledon but lost in the first round to fellow qualifier Clara Burel.

In July, Perez partnered Samantha Stosur in women's doubles at the 2020 Olympic Games, where they reached the quarterfinals. In the same month, Perez entered the final of an ITF event in Lisbon, Portugal. In October, she reached another ITF final in Portugal. She won her third title at the 2021 Tenerife Ladies Open with Ulrikke Eikeri. Perez ended 2021 with a singles rank of 196 and a doubles rank of 42.

2022: Wimbledon QF, two WTA 1000 finals & top 30 debut in doubles
Perez lost in the first round of the Australian Open qualifying.

She reached the quarterfinals at Wimbledon, and back-to-back WTA 1000 finals at the Canadian Open and the Cincinnati Open with Nicole Melichar.

Performance timelines
Only main-draw results in WTA Tour, Grand Slam tournaments, Fed Cup/Billie Jean King Cup and Olympic Games are included in win–loss records.

Singles
Current after the 2023 Australian Open.

Doubles
Current after the 2023 Australian Open.

Significant finals

WTA 1000 finals

Doubles: 2 (runner-ups)

WTA career finals

Doubles: 14 (5 titles, 9 runner-ups)

WTA Challenger finals

Doubles: 1 (title)

ITF Circuit finals

Singles: 11 (2 titles, 9 runner–ups)

Doubles: 28 (18 titles, 10 runner–ups)

Notes

References

External links
 
 
 
 Ellen Perez at the Georgia Bulldogs and Lady Bulldogs

1995 births
Living people
Australian female tennis players
Australian people of Spanish descent
Australian people of Macedonian descent
Sportspeople from Wollongong
Tennis people from New South Wales
Georgia Lady Bulldogs tennis players
Olympic tennis players of Australia
Tennis players at the 2020 Summer Olympics
21st-century Australian women